An air balloon usually refers to a hot air balloon.

It may also refer to:

Balloon (aeronautics)
A generic balloon
Balloon (disambiguation)

Music
"Air Balloon" (song), a 2014 song by Lily Allen
"Air Balloon", a song by Savant from the album Orakel
"Air Balloon", a song by Vixen from the album Tangerine
"Hot Air Balloon", a song by Derek Minor from the 2013 album Minorville
"Hot Air Balloon", a comedy routine by Dane Cook from 2010 I Did My Best: Greatest Hits Album
"Hot Air Balloon", a song by Apollo Sunshine from the 2003 album Katonah
"Hot Air Balloon", a song by Owl City from the album Ocean Eyes
"Hot Air Balloons", a song by Freezepop from the 2010 album Imaginary Friends
"Hot Air Balloons", a song by Some Girls from the 2005 album The DNA Will Have Its Say
Hot Air Balloon (rock opera), a 1998 rock opera by Jon Gutwillig of The Disco Biscuits

Other
 Air Balloon (pub), an 18th-century pub and major road junction in Gloucestershire, England
 , two 18th-century merchant vessels named "Air Balloon"

See also
 Hot air balloon (disambiguation)